Agnes Barr Auchencloss (30 May 1886 – 4 July 1972) was a Scottish medical officer. She is best known for her work at the World War I munitions factory H.M. Factory Gretna. She is included in the University of Glasgow Roll of Honour.

Family and education 
Agnes Barr Auchencloss was born on 30 May 1886 to parents James Currie Auchencloss and Jane Crawford, in Paisley. Her father was a starch and cornflour merchant. She had a brother, also named James Currie Achencloss. Both were educated at Paisley Grammar School and Glasgow University.  Auchencloss qualified in medicine MBChB on 24 April 1911, after winning nine class prizes including first class in Anatomy and Surgery. She met and married Swedish chemist Gosta Lundholm, whose family had been in Scotland for many years, and had British citizenship. Her husband then worked at the British South African Explosive Co.Ltd. which served the gold mines in the Transvaal, South Africa. Her father-in-law Carl Olof Lundholm had been commissioned by Alfred Nobel to manage his dynamite factory in Ardeer, Scotland.  

Her first son was born in 1915, at Modderfontein South Africa, and named Eric Olof Lundholm, and her second son was born there in 1921, named Alan Basil Auchenloss Lundholm, in between these years the family had lived in Scotland near the munitions factory in Gretna. They then returned to Scotland as her husband Gosta was working in factories at Westquarter  (making fulminate of mercury) and then Ardeer, and they lived in Falkirk, then in Ardrossan. Her eldest son, Eric was a Royal Engineer in the Middle East during World War II. Her husband died in 1969 and she moved in with her son Alan and his wife in Torrance, Glasgow.

She died in the Edinburgh City Hospital on 4 July 1972.

Career 
Auchencloss started as house doctor at Royal Alexandra Infirmary, Paisley, then at Kilmarnock Infirmary. In 1914 she was a volunteer doctor in Afrikaaner communities in the veldt in South Africa.  From June 1916, her husband had been sent back to Scotland to help build the factory and later lead chemist in the nitro-glycerine department in the newly established munitions operations, H.M. Factory Gretna. Auchencloss became the Medical Officer for what became 20,000 workers, mainly women. It was a very dangerous environment, with risks of injuries and explosions. When the King and Queen visited the factory in 1917, she was one of those they met and spoke with.

After the war, her husband's work moved to South Africa again and back to Scotland in 1929, where Auchencloss worked as a volunteer, latterly with the Women Citizen's Organization. She was described as generously giving her time to the sick and injured throughout her life. 
 
Auchencloss was included in the University of Glasgow World War One Roll of Honour.

External links 

 image of Agnes Barr Auchencloss note: copyright The University of Glasgow. 
archive of her son Eric Olof Lundholm includes husband's family tree history

References 

1886 births
1972 deaths
Alumni of the University of Glasgow
20th-century Scottish medical doctors
People from Paisley, Renfrewshire
People educated at Paisley Grammar School